Bartok is a 1964 British television film about Béla Bartók. It was directed by Ken Russell.

It was one of a series of Russell films on composers.

Cast
Boris Ranevsky as Bartók
Pauline Boty as prostitute
Sandor Elès as client
Peter Brett as Bluebeard
Rosalind Watkins as Judith

References

External links

Bartok at BFI Screenonline
Review of film at Diabolique

1964 television films
1964 films
British television films
Films directed by Ken Russell
Béla Bartók
1960s English-language films